Gaj's Latin alphabet, also known as  or , is the form of the Latin script used for writing Serbo-Croatian and all of its standard varieties: Bosnian, Croatian, Montenegrin, and Serbian.

The alphabet was initially devised by Croatian linguist Ljudevit Gaj in 1835 during the Illyrian movement in ethnically Croatian parts of Austrian Empire. It was largely based on Jan Hus's Czech alphabet and was meant to serve as a unified orthography for three Croat-populated kingdoms within the Austrian Empire at the time, namely Croatia, Dalmatia and Slavonia, and their three dialect groups, Kajkavian, Chakavian and Shtokavian, which historically utilized different spelling rules.

A slightly modified version of it was later adopted as the formal Latin writing system for the unified Serbo-Croatian standard language per the Vienna Literary Agreement. It served as one of the official scripts in the unified South Slavic state of Yugoslavia alongside Vuk's Cyrillic alphabet.

A slightly reduced version is used as the alphabet for Slovene, and a slightly expanded version is used as the alphabet for modern standard Montenegrin. A modified version is used for the romanization of Macedonian. It further influenced alphabets of Romani languages that are spoken in Southeast Europe, namely Vlax and Balkan Romani.

Letters

The alphabet consists of thirty upper and lower case letters:

Gaj's original alphabet contained the digraph , which Serbian linguist Đuro Daničić later replaced with the letter .

The letters do not have names, and consonants are normally pronounced as such when spelling is necessary (or followed by a short schwa, e.g. ). When clarity is needed, they are pronounced similar to the German alphabet: a, be, ce, če, će, de, dže, đe, e, ef, ge, ha, i, je, ka, el, elj, em, en, enj, o, pe, er, es, eš, te, u, ve, ze, že. These rules for pronunciation of individual letters are common as far as the 22 letters that match the ISO basic Latin alphabet are concerned. The use of others is mostly limited to the context of linguistics, while in mathematics,  is commonly pronounced jot, as in the German of Germany.

Digraphs
 In dictionaries, njegov comes after novine, in a separate  section after the end of the  section; bolje comes after bolnica; nadžak (digraph ) comes after nadživjeti (prefix nad-), and so forth.
If only the initial letter of a word is capitalized, only the first of the two component letters is capitalized: Njemačka ('Germany'), not NJemačka. In Unicode, the form  is referred to as titlecase, as opposed to the uppercase form , representing one of the few cases in which titlecase and uppercase differ. Uppercase is used only if the entire word was capitalized: NJEMAČKA.

In vertical writing (such as on signs),  are written horizontally, as a unit. For instance, if mjenjačnica ('bureau de change') is written vertically,  appears on the fourth line (but note  and  appear separately on the first and second lines, respectively, because  contains two letters, not one). In crossword puzzles,  each occupy a single square.
If words are written with a space between each letter (such as on signs), each digraph is written as a unit. For instance: M J E NJ A Č N I C A.

Origins

In 1830 in Buda, he published the book Kratka osnova horvatsko-slavenskog pravopisanja ("Brief basics of the Croatian-Slavonic orthography"), which was the first common Croatian orthography book. It was not the first ever Croatian orthography work, as it was preceded by works of Rajmund Đamanjić (1639), Ignjat Đurđević and Pavao Ritter Vitezović. Croats had previously used the Latin script, but some of the specific sounds were not uniformly represented. Versions of the Hungarian alphabet were most commonly used, but others were too, in an often confused, inconsistent fashion.

Gaj followed the example of Pavao Ritter Vitezović and the Czech orthography, making one letter of the Latin script for each sound in the language. Following Vuk Karadžić's reform of Cyrillic in the early nineteenth century, in the 1830s Ljudevit Gaj did the same for latinica, using the Czech system and producing a one-to-one grapheme-phoneme correlation between the Cyrillic and Latin orthographies, resulting in a parallel system.

The original Gaj alphabet was eventually revised, but only the digraph  has been replaced with Daničić's , while ,  and  have been kept.

Correspondence Serbian Cyrillic-Latin alphabets 
The following table provides the upper and lower case forms of the Serbian Cyrillic alphabet, along with the equivalent forms in the Serbian Latin alphabet and the International Phonetic Alphabet (IPA) value for each letter. The letters do not have names, and consonants are normally pronounced as such when spelling is necessary (or followed by a short schwa, e.g. /fə/).:

Computing
In the 1990s, there was a general confusion about the proper character encoding to use to write text in Latin Croatian on computers.

An attempt was made to apply the 7-bit "YUSCII", later "CROSCII", which included the five letters with diacritics at the expense of five non-letter characters ([, ], {, }, @), but it was ultimately unsuccessful. Because the ASCII character @ sorts before A, this led to jokes calling it žabeceda (žaba=frog, abeceda=alphabet).
Other short-lived vendor-specific efforts were also undertaken.
The 8-bit ISO 8859-2 (Latin-2) standard was developed by ISO.
MS-DOS introduced 8-bit encoding CP852 for Central European languages, disregarding the ISO standard.
Microsoft Windows spread yet another 8-bit encoding called CP1250, which had a few letters mapped one-to-one with ISO 8859-2, but also had some mapped elsewhere.
Apple's Macintosh Central European encoding does not include the entire Gaj's Latin alphabet. Instead, a separate codepage, called MacCroatian encoding, is used.
EBCDIC also has a Latin-2 encoding.
The preferred character encoding for Croatian today is either the ISO 8859-2, or the Unicode encoding UTF-8 (with two bytes or 16 bits necessary to use the letters with diacritics). However, one can still find programs as well as databases that use CP1250, CP852 or even CROSCII.

Usage for Slovene
Since the early 1840s, Gaj's alphabet was increasingly used for Slovene. In the beginning, it was most commonly used by Slovene authors who treated Slovene as a variant of Serbo-Croatian (such as Stanko Vraz), but it was later accepted by a large spectrum of Slovene-writing authors. The breakthrough came in 1845, when the Slovene conservative leader Janez Bleiweis started using Gaj's script in his journal Kmetijske in rokodelske novice ("Agricultural and Artisan News"), which was read by a wide public in the countryside. By 1850, Gaj's alphabet (known as gajica in Slovene) became the only official Slovene alphabet, replacing three other writing systems that had circulated in the Slovene Lands since the 1830s: the traditional bohoričica, named after Adam Bohorič, who codified it; the dajnčica, named after Peter Dajnko; and the metelčica, named after Franc Serafin Metelko.

The Slovene version of Gaj's alphabet differs from the Serbo-Croatian one in several ways:

As in Serbo-Croatian, Slovene orthography does not make use of diacritics to mark accent in words in regular writing, but headwords in dictionaries are given with them to account for homographs. Also, it does not reflect consonant voicing assimilation: compare e.g. Slovene  and Serbo-Croatian  ('junkyard', 'waste').

Usage for Macedonian

Romanization of Macedonian is done according to Gaj's Latin alphabet but is slightly modified. Gaj's ć and đ are not used at all, with ḱ and ǵ introduced instead. The rest of the letters of the alphabet are used to represent the equivalent Cyrillic letters. Also, Macedonian uses the letter dz, which is not part of the Serbo-Croatian phonemic inventory. However, the backs of record sleeves published in the former Yugoslavia, by non-Macedonian publishers, (such as Mizar's debut album) used ć and đ, like other places. As per the orthography, both lj and ĺ are accepted as romanisations of љ and both nj and ń for њ. For informal purposes, like texting, most Macedonian speakers will omit the diacritics or use a digraph- and trigraph-based system for ease as there is no Macedonian Latin keyboard supported on most systems. For example, š becomes sh or s, and dž becomes dzh or dz.

Keyboard layout

The standard Gaj's Latin alphabet keyboard layout for personal computers is as follows:

See also

Glagolitic alphabet
Montenegrin alphabet
Serbian Cyrillic alphabet
Serbo-Croatian
Slovene alphabet
Yugoslav braille
Yugoslav manual alphabet
Romanization of Serbian – describes usage not the alphabet

Sources

References

External links

Omniglot

Latin alphabets
Alphabet
Alphabet
Serbo-Croatian language
Slovene alphabet
Writing systems introduced in the 19th century
Bosnian language
1835 introductions